The Mountain Province Provincial Board is the Sangguniang Panlalawigan (provincial legislature) of the Philippine province of Mountain Province.

The members are elected via plurality-at-large voting: the province is divided into two districts, each having four seats. A voter votes up to four names, with the top four candidates per district being elected. The vice governor is the ex officio presiding officer, and only votes to break ties. The vice governor is elected via the plurality voting system province-wide.

The districts used in appropriation of members is not coextensive with the legislative district of Mountain Province; unlike congressional representation which is at-large, Mountain Province is divided into two districts for representation in the Sangguniang Panlalawigan.

Aside from the regular members, the board also includes the provincial federation presidents of the Liga ng mga Barangay (ABC, from its old name "Association of Barangay Captains"), the Sangguniang Kabataan (SK, youth councils) and the Philippine Councilors League (PCL). Mountain Province's provincial board also has a reserved seat for its indigenous people (IPMR).

Apportionment

List of members

Current members 
These are the members after the 2019 local elections and 2018 barangay and SK elections:

 Vice Governor: Francis Tauli (PDP–Laban)

References 

Politics of Mountain Province
Provincial boards in the Philippines